Jill Sobule is the second album by the American singer-songwriter Jill Sobule, released on April 7, 1995. The disc contained the singles "Good Person Inside", "Supermodel" and "I Kissed a Girl". The album sold 100,000 copies in the US, making it her most commercially successful record.

Track listing

The first release of the album does not contain "Supermodel". After "Supermodel" appeared on the Clueless film soundtrack and was released as a single, the album was reissued with the song.

Personnel
Jill Sobule – guitar, sound effects, vocals, background vocals, tambo drums
Sam Bacco – percussion, tympani
Richard Barone – vocals, background vocals
Pat Bergeson – harmonica
J.D. Blair – snare drums
Chris Carmichael – violin, cello
Sue Davis – background vocals
Robin Eaton – bass guitar, guitar, vocals, background vocals
Buddy Emmons – pedal steel guitar
Mac Gayden – banjo
Byron House – bass guitar
Brad Jones – organ, synthesizer, bass guitar, flute, guitar, mandolin, piano, keyboards
Wayne Kramer – bass guitar
Craig Krampf – drums
Viktor Krauss – bass guitar
Kenny Malone – percussion, drums
Jerry Dale McFadden – accordion, sound effects
Eric Moon – keyboards
Al Perkins – pedal steel guitar
Ross Rice – drums, electric piano
Kirby Shelstad – drums, talking drum
Jim Wizniewski – flute

Production
Production: Brad Jones & Robin Eaton
Engineering: Brad Jones
Mixing: Roger Moutenot
Mastering: Greg Calbi

Charts
Album

Singles

References

External links
Lyrics, song samples and video, hosted with permission at MTV.

1995 albums
Jill Sobule albums
Albums produced by Brad Jones (musician)
Lava Records albums
Atlantic Records albums